is a former Japanese football player. He played for Japan national team.

Club career
Watanabe was born in Fujieda on September 10, 1972. After graduating from Chuo University, he joined Kashiwa Reysol in 1995. He played as regular player from first season. The club won the champions at 1999 J.League Cup. At the Final, he scored a tie goal in the 89th minute and he was selected MVP. The club also won the 3rd place in 1999 and 2000 J1 League. He retired end of 2004 season.

National team career
On August 13, 1997, Watanabe debuted for Japan national team against Brazil.

Club statistics

National team statistics

References

External links
 
 Japan National Football Team Database
 

1972 births
Living people
Chuo University alumni
Association football people from Shizuoka Prefecture
Japanese footballers
Japan international footballers
J1 League players
Kashiwa Reysol players
Association football defenders
People from Fujieda, Shizuoka